Mickaël Justin Borot (born May 31, 1975) is a French Taekwondo athlete.

References
Profile

1975 births
Living people
French people of Martiniquais descent
French male taekwondo practitioners
Taekwondo practitioners at the 2008 Summer Olympics
Olympic taekwondo practitioners of France
Universiade medalists in taekwondo
Universiade gold medalists for France
European Taekwondo Championships medalists
World Taekwondo Championships medalists